Peter Mafany Musonge (born 3 December 1942) is a Cameroonian politician who was Prime Minister of Cameroon from September 19, 1996, to December 8, 2004.

Biography
Musonge was born at Muea in the Fako Department of Cameroon's South-West Region. He received a Bachelor of Science degree in civil engineering at Drexel University and received a Master of Science degree in structural engineering at Stanford University, and has worked on a variety of development projects. He has been a longtime supporter and assistant of President Paul Biya, and is an Anglophone and a member of the Bakweri ethnic group. He left his position as Prime Minister after a cabinet reshuffle which followed Biya's successful 2004 reelection, for which Musonge served as campaign manager.

Musonge is a member of the Central Committee of the ruling Cameroon People's Democratic Movement (CPDM). Biya appointed Musonge as Grand Chancellor of National Orders on April 4, 2007.

In May 2013, President Biya appointed Musonge to the Senate of Cameroon. He was one of 30 senators to receive their seats by presidential appointment; the other 70 senators were indirectly elected. Biya appointed three senators for each region, and Musonge was one of the three to come from the South-West Region. There was some speculation that he might receive the post of President of the Senate, but Marcel Niat Njifenji was elected to that post on 12 June 2013. Musonge was instead designated as President of the CPDM's Senate Parliamentary Group.

References

1942 births
Living people
Drexel University alumni
Prime Ministers of Cameroon
Cameroon People's Democratic Movement politicians